Loxomorpha flavidissimalis is a moth in the family Crambidae. It was described by Augustus Radcliffe Grote in 1877. It is found in the United States, where it has been recorded from Texas, Florida, North Carolina and West Virginia. It is also found in Mexico and Puerto Rico. It has also been recorded from Australia.

The wingspan is about 18 mm. The forewings are bright yellow with grayish antemedial and postmedial lines. The discal spot is situated in a grayish patch. The hindwings are similar, but slightly paler near the base. In the United States, adults have been recorded on wing from May to July and in September.

The larvae feed on Opuntia species. They are yellowish white and reach a length of about 11 mm when full-grown.

References

Moths described in 1877
Spilomelinae